Foreign relations exist between Australia and Switzerland. Switzerland opened a consulate in Sydney in 1855 and one in Melbourne in 1856. Both countries established diplomatic relations in 1961. Switzerland has an embassy in Canberra, a consulate-general in Sydney and 6 honorary consulates in Adelaide, Brisbane, Darwin, Hobart, Melbourne and Perth. In November 2022, Australia opened an embassy in Bern and maintains a consulate-general in Geneva.

See also 
 List of Swiss Ambassadors to Australia
 Foreign relations of Australia
 Foreign relations of Switzerland

References

External links 
 Australian Department of Foreign Affairs and Trade about relations with Switzerland
 Swiss Federal Department of Foreign Affairs about relations with Australia

 

 
Switzerland
Bilateral relations of Switzerland